I'm Your Man is the debut album of American country music artist Jason Sellers, released in 1997 via BNA Records. Singles released from the album include the title track, "That Does It" and "This Small Divide", all of which charted on the Billboard country charts in 1997. In addition, the song "Can't Help Calling Your Name" was later recorded on Sellers' 1999 album A Matter of Time, from which it was released as a single. "Hole in My Heart" was previously recorded by former NRBQ member Al Anderson on his 1996 album Pay Before You Pump.

Critical reception
Jeff Davis of Country Standard Time gave a mostly unfavorable review, saying that "Sellers is just another artist crafted by the mainstream, trying to make it by imitation" and that Sellers seemed to be emulating Vince Gill on some tracks. His review cited the title track and "I Can't Stay Long" showed a sense of personality.

Track listing

Personnel
Al Anderson – electric guitar
J. T. Corenflos – electric guitar
Melodie Crittenden - background vocals
Dan Dugmore – steel guitar
Chris Farren – acoustic guitar, background vocals
Pat Flynn – acoustic guitar
Larry Franklin – fiddle
Vince Gill – background vocals
John Hobbs – keyboards, Hammond organ
Dann Huff – electric guitar
David Hungate – bass guitar
John Barlow Jarvis – piano
Jeff King – electric guitar
Martina McBride – background vocals; duet vocals on "This Small Divide"
Greg Morrow – drums, percussion
Nashville String Machine – string section
Brent Rowan – electric guitar
Darrell Scott – acoustic guitar
Jason Sellers – lead vocals, background vocals, bass guitar
Leland Sklar – bass guitar
Glenn Worf – bass guitar

References

1997 debut albums
BNA Records albums
Jason Sellers albums
Albums produced by Chris Farren (country musician)